WQRB (95.1 FM) is an American commercial radio station broadcasting a country music format. Licensed to Bloomer, Wisconsin, United States, the station serves the Eau Claire area. The station is owned by iHeartMedia, Inc.

History
The station went on the air as WPHQ on February 7, 1990.  On July 1, 1992, the station changed its call sign to the current WQRB.

References

External links

QRB
Country radio stations in the United States
Radio stations established in 1990
IHeartMedia radio stations